Wayne Ferreira was the defending champion, but lost in the first round this year.

Tommy Haas won the tournament, beating Nicolas Kiefer in the final, 7–6(8–6), 6–4.

Seeds

Draw

Finals

Top half

Bottom half

External links
 Main draw
 Qualifying draw

Los Angeles Open (tennis)
2004 ATP Tour